Tolomei may refer to:

People
Bernardo Tolomei (1272–1348), Roman Catholic cleric
Stella de' Tolomei (died 1419), Italian courtier
Antonio de' Tolomei (died 1498), Roman Catholic prelate
Claudio Tolomei (1492–1556), Italian philologist
Giovanni Battista Tolomei (1653–1726), Italian Jesuit cardinal
Ettore Tolomei (1865–1952), Italian nationalist
Rogério Tolomei Teixeira (a.k.a. Rogério Skylab; born 1956), Brazilian musician, poet, and essayist

Other uses
Palazzo Tolomei, an urban palace in Siena, Italy
Collegio Tolomei, Siena, high school in Siena, Italy

See also
Pia de' Tolomei (disambiguation)